The 1926 Texas Tech Matadors football team represented Texas Technological College—now known as Texas Tech University—as an independent during in the 1926 college football season. Led by second year head coach Ewing Y. Freeland, the Matadors compiled a record of 6–1–3 The season marked the first time that Texas Tech played the TCU Horned Frogs.

Schedule

Notes
1.1927 La Ventana yearbook lists the score of this game as 28–7.
2.1927 La Ventana yearbook lists the score of this game as 27–6.

References

Texas Tech
Texas Tech Red Raiders football seasons
Texas Tech Matadors football